Václav Chalupa Jr. (born 7 December 1967 in Jindřichův Hradec, Czechoslovakia) is a Czech rower who competed at six consecutive Olympics from 1988 to 2008, winning a silver medal in 1992 behind Thomas Lange in the single scull.

Career
His first coach was his father Václav Chalupa Sr., who competed at the 1960 and 1964 Olympics and reestablished the only rowing club in their small town when he was thirteen. From 1989 until 2004 he was coached by Zdeněk Pecka.

He rowed at sixteen world championships. In the single scull, he came second at four consecutive meets from 1989 to 1993, and third in 1995, 1998, and 2001 (when just 0.7 seconds separated the top three rowers). At his final world championships in Poznan, he came second in the coxed pairs.

He came first at the 1990 Goodwill Games in the single sculls, at three World Cup events in 1991, 1993, and 1999, and at the Hackett Thames World Sculling Challenge in 2000.

He is a captain in the Czech army and a skilled repairman of agricultural machinery.

It is estimated that he has rowed 60 000 km in his career. He is a fan of fellow rowers Thomas Lange and Steve Redgrave, and of Mr. Bean.

His oldest son Václav (born 1994) is also a rower.

He holds the record for the Diamond Challenge Sculls at the Henley Royal Regatta (1989) with a time of 7.23 min.

See also
 List of athletes with the most appearances at Olympic Games

References

External links
 
 
 

1967 births
Living people
People from Jindřichův Hradec
Olympic rowers of Czechoslovakia
Olympic rowers of the Czech Republic
Olympic silver medalists for Czechoslovakia
Rowers at the 1988 Summer Olympics
Rowers at the 1992 Summer Olympics
Rowers at the 1996 Summer Olympics
Rowers at the 2000 Summer Olympics
Rowers at the 2004 Summer Olympics
Rowers at the 2008 Summer Olympics
Olympic medalists in rowing
Czech male rowers
World Rowing Championships medalists for Czechoslovakia
Medalists at the 1992 Summer Olympics
World Rowing Championships medalists for the Czech Republic
Thomas Keller Medal recipients
European Rowing Championships medalists
Competitors at the 1990 Goodwill Games
Sportspeople from the South Bohemian Region